Simon Barry  (born 25 September 1966, in London, UK) is a Canadian screenwriter, film producer, director and television producer.

Career
Barry is best known for his work on the Canadian sci-fi series Continuum (2012–2015). In 2013, building on his track record on Continuum, he joined Stephen Hegyes as co-founders of Reality Distortion Field, a Vancouver-based production company that develops original content for sci-fi, horror, and fantasy genres.

Through Reality Distortion Field, Barry is show-runner and executive producer for the Netflix fantasy series Warrior Nun (2020).

Filmography

Feature credits

Television credits

References

External links

The Hollywood Reporter – 'Continuum' Creator Simon Barry, Stephen Hegyes Launch Genre Production Company – November 2013
Collider – Simon Barry Talks CONTINUUM, What They Wanted to Achieve in Season 2, and Looking Forward to Season 3 – August, 2013

1966 births
Film producers from British Columbia
Canadian television producers
Living people
Canadian male screenwriters
21st-century Canadian screenwriters
Canadian television directors
Canadian television writers